Robert Lomer "Bob" McCord (March 20, 1934 – October 21, 2016) was a Canadian professional ice hockey player who played 316 games in the National Hockey League between 1963 and 1973. He played for the Minnesota North Stars, Detroit Red Wings, St. Louis Blues, and Boston Bruins. The rest of his career, which lasted from 1953 to 1975, was spent in various minor leagues, mainly the American Hockey League.

Career statistics

Regular season and playoffs

References

External links 

1934 births
2016 deaths
Boston Bruins players
Canadian ice hockey right wingers
Denver Spurs players
Denver Spurs (WHL) players
Detroit Red Wings players
Hershey Bears players
Ice hockey people from Ontario
Minnesota North Stars players
Montreal Royals (QSHL) players
People from Cochrane District
Phoenix Roadrunners (WHL) players
Pittsburgh Hornets players
Springfield Indians players
Trois-Rivières Lions (1955–1960) players